Karl Johan Haagensen (26 March 1871, in Oslo – 25 August 1918) was a Norwegian gymnast who competed in the 1906 Summer Olympics.

In 1906 he won the gold medal as member of the Norwegian gymnastics team in the team competition at the age of 35.

External links
profile

1871 births
1918 deaths
Norwegian male artistic gymnasts
Gymnasts at the 1906 Intercalated Games
Medalists at the 1906 Intercalated Games
Sportspeople from Oslo
20th-century Norwegian people